The first season of Bad Girls All-Star Battle premiered on May 21, 2013, with Ray J as the host. It was deemed a success for Oxygen raking in a record-breaking 1.73 million viewers during its premiere, making history as the highest-rated series debut for the network.

Contestants

Contestant progress

Notes
 The contestant won the competition.
 The contestant came in 2nd place.
 The contestant was eliminated by coming in last in the First Round of a 2 Round Competition.
 The contestant was a part of the winning team, and was exempt from elimination.
 The contestant won the Bad Girls All Star Battle Challenge.
 The contestant won both the Captain's Challenge and the Team's Challenge.
 The contestant won the Captain's Challenge, but lost the Team's Challenge.
 The contestant lost the Team's Challenge or Bad Girls All Star Battle Challenge, but was not put up for elimination.
 The contestant was nominated for elimination and was in the bottom two or bottom three.
 The contestant was eliminated from the competition.
 The contestant withdrew from the competition due to injury.
 The contestant quit the competition.

Natalie is the first contestant to quit the competition, return, and be nominated all in the same week.
Shannon and Rocky are the first contestants on All Star Battle to quit the competition. This would then be followed by Andrea Bowman in Season 2.
This would be the first and only time so far to have an elimination that went between 2 Episodes.
Erika is the first contestant to withdraw from the competition due to an injury.
Danni and Gabi were nominated 3 times during this season being the most this entire season.
Flo broke a record this season and in both seasons for winning the most individual challenges standing at 5 wins.

Voting history

Notes

Episodes

Notes

References

External links
 

2013 American television seasons
Television shows set in Los Angeles